Jiz Lee is an American pornographic performer, considered a major star of queer porn. Lee is an advocate for the ethical production and consumption of pornography and for the labor rights and sexual autonomy of adult entertainment performers.

Lee is genderqueer and uses the gender-neutral pronouns they/them.

Adult film career
Lee's first pornographic film was The Crash Pad for Pink and White Productions, released in 2005. Lee initially only did film scenes with lovers, and self-describes as a "self-agent", only working with directors met beforehand first. Jiz Lee continued to work with Pink and White Productions on Shine Louise Houston's feature 'SNAPSHOT'.

Screen credits 
In addition to their adult screen credits, Jiz Lee has appeared in numerous other queer and trans projects, including African American director Cheryl Dunye's queer romantic comedy of errors Mommy is Coming, in which Lee appears with an international cast that included the Black Boricua porn performer Papi Coxxx.

They had a recurring role as Pony, a dominatrix for the character Sarah Pfefferman, in the series Transparent.

They have also appeared in Sense8, the science fiction television series created by the production team of transgender producers Lana and Lilly Wachowski.

They also performed the role of the genderfluid conjoined twins in video for The Residents's theatrical stage production of the album God in Three Persons premiered at MoMA in January 2020.

Activism

Lee is known as an advocate of sex workers' rights, and self-describes as a "pleasure activist". They run the philanthropic porn experiment "Karma Pervs", which seeks to raise funds for sex workers' causes. Jiz Lee is also a significant figure in the genre of queer pornography, and is considered to be a visible genderqueer person in porn. Finally, they are considered a significant contributor to feminist pornography and women's pornography. However, Lee does not use the term "feminist porn", and has stated that the term implies that porn cannot be inherently feminist.

Lee's growing popularity may be attributed in part to the growing quantity of production of feminist pornography and queer pornography. These genres of porn have grown significantly in marketing and consumption in the 21st century.

Lee is a writer, as well as the editor of Coming Out Like a Porn Star, which compiles the stories of adult performers. The book was inspired by Lee's own struggles with "coming out" to their family about working in the adult entertainment industry. One review defined the book as ""a lesson in social behavior and prejudice" directed at adult performers. Porn scholar Lynn Comella described the book as "a testament to the power of storytelling and the importance of sex workers telling their stories in their own words." Lee has written on feminism and porn.

Lee has been interviewed in multiple articles on feminist, queer, and trans issues, especially on queer pornography. Lee has spoken at academic institutions, such as Stanford and UC Berkeley, on queer sexuality and their experiences in porn. In numerous contexts, Lee, in their public statements, has specifically addressed the importance of using gender-neutral pronouns.

Personal life
Jiz Lee is a graduate of Mills College.

Lee was assigned female at birth, and is genderqueer, and use the gender-neutral pronouns they/them.

Lee has been in a relationship with fellow pornographic performers Syd Blakovich and Dallas. With Blakovich, they created the four-year performance art collaboration "Twincest" in 2004.

Awards and nominations

Publications
 They came to see the [queer] porn star talk. In: Porn Studies. Vol. 2, No. 2–3, Taylor & Francis, London 2015, ISSN 2326-8743, pp. 272–274.
 Jiz Lee und Rebecca Sullivan: Porn and labour: the labour of porn studies. In: Jiz Lee und Rebecca Sullivan (Hrsg.): Porn Studies, Vol. 3, No. 2, Taylor & Francis, London 27. Juli 2016, ISSN 2326-8743, pp. 104–106. Issue online
 Uncategorized: Genderqueer Identity and Performance in Independent and Mainstream Porn. In: Tristan Taormino (Hrsg.): The Feminist Porn Book: The Politics of Producing Pleasure. The Feminist Press at CUNY, New York 2013, pp. 273–278.
 as Co-Editor: Coming Out Like a Porn Star: Essays on Pornography, Protection, and Privacy. ThreeL Media, Los Angeles 2015, .
 as a model: Dave Naz: Genderqueer: And Other Gender Identities. Rare Bird Books, Los Angeles 2014, .

References

External links

 
 
 
 
 
 

Year of birth missing (living people)
People with non-binary gender identities
American LGBT writers
Living people
Pornographic film actors from Hawaii
LGBT people from Hawaii
Queer pornographic film actors
Sex-positive feminists
Mills College alumni
Sex worker activists in the United States
American non-binary actors
Non-binary activists